This is a list of games for the Nintendo Entertainment System (NES) home video game console. Some games have been officially licensed by Nintendo, and some are unlicensed.

The final licensed NES game released was the PAL-exclusive The Lion King in 1995. 



Licensed games
Of the 716 total licensed games released for the Nintendo Entertainment System (NES) during its lifespan; 367 were released only in North America, 35 were released only in PAL countries, 1 was released only in Hong Kong and 313 were released everywhere. Games dated October 18, 1985 are launch titles for North America.

Championship games

Unreleased games

Canceled games
The following games were initially announced as Nintendo Entertainment System and/or Family Computer titles, however were subsequently cancelled or postponed indefinitely by developers or publishers.

Unlicensed games
There are  unlicensed games in the NES library released without approval from Nintendo during the console's lifespan. There are an additional  unlicensed games released after the console's lifespan.

Console's lifespan

After lifespan

External links

See also
 List of the best selling video games on the Nintendo Entertainment System
 List of Famicom games
 List of Famicom Disk System games
 Lists of video games

References

Nintendo Entertainment System games
Nintendo Entertainment System

ko:패밀리 컴퓨터 게임 목록